Wacław Okulicz-Kozaryn (8 February 1884 – 14 April 1974) was a Polish wrestler. He competed in the Greco-Roman middleweight event at the 1924 Summer Olympics.

References

External links
 

1884 births
1974 deaths
Olympic wrestlers of Poland
Wrestlers at the 1924 Summer Olympics
Polish male sport wrestlers
People from Vitebsk District
People from Vitebsk Governorate
People from the Russian Empire of Polish descent
Burials at Powązki Military Cemetery